Valley Head is a town in DeKalb County, Alabama, United States. Although the town incorporated in 1921, it was also listed as being incorporated on the 1890 U.S. Census. At the 2020 census, the population was 577.

Geography
Valley Head is located at  (34.565301, -85.616426).

Climate 

Valley Head has a humid subtropical climate (CFA) while holding many monthly record lows for Alabama, it falls short of the all-time record low of  held in New Market, Alabama.

Demographics

As of the census of 2000, there were 611 people, 244 households, and 175 families residing in the town. The racial makeup of the town was 92.47% White, 2.29% Black or African American, 0.65% Native American, 0.16% Asian, 0.16% Pacific Islander, and 4.26% from two or more races. 2.29% of the population were Hispanic or Latino of any race.

There were 244 households, out of which 28.7% had children under the age of 18 living with them, 54.5% were married couples living together, 14.8% had a female householder with no husband present, and 27.9% were non-families. 25.0% of all households were made up of individuals, and 11.9% had someone living alone who was 65 years of age or older. The average household size was 2.50 and the average family size was 2.98.

In the town, the population was spread out, with 24.2% under the age of 18, 9.3% from 18 to 24, 24.7% from 25 to 44, 25.2% from 45 to 64, and 16.5% who were 65 years of age or older. The median age was 38 years. For every 100 females, there were 85.2 males. For every 100 females age 18 and over, there were 86.7 males.

The median income for a household in the town was $29,013, and the median income for a family was $36,250. Males had a median income of $28,558 versus $17,222 for females. The per capita income for the town was $13,582. About 12.2% of families and 15.9% of the population were below the poverty line, including 21.4% of those under age 18 and 21.5% of those age 65 or over.

Education
Valley Head School, home of the "Tigers", is a member of the DeKalb County School System.

Notable people
Howard Finster, folk artist
E. T. York, former director of the Alabama Cooperative Extension Service, administrator of the federal Extension Service, interim president of the University of Florida, and chancellor of the State University System of Florida

References 

Towns in DeKalb County, Alabama
Towns in Alabama
1921 establishments in Alabama